John Leekley is an American writer, director and producer.  He is one of the most prolific writer/producers in television.  He received a Primetime Emmy Award for his work as executive producer/writer on the HBO Original Series Spawn.

Leekley was creator/writer/executive producer of the series Kindred: The Embraced for the Fox Network, which is a cult favorite on the web.  He started his television career as co-producer, writer, and creator of the landmark eight-hour CBS mini-series The Blue and The Gray (CBS), starring Gregory Peck as Abraham Lincoln, based on the novel of the same name, that he authored.  He has also served as writer/producer for several highly regarded movies including In the Company of Darkness starring Helen Hunt (CBS), She Fought Alone (NBC) which was the first movie to confront the issue of date rape, Buried Secrets (NBC), the four-hour mini-series Night Sins (CBS) based on the best-selling novel of that name, and Mafia Doctor (CBS). He was the creator of the dark supernatural series Wolf Lake for CBS centering on teenagers in a small town in the Northwest who are changelings.  He has also written and produced a number of other series for television. In 1996, he and his John Leekley Productions company signed to a exclusive production agreement with MTM Enterprises.

Leekley wrote and directed the theatrical feature film The Prince of Central Park, starring Academy Award nominees Harvey Keitel, Kathleen Turner, Danny Aiello, and Cathy Moriarty. He later completed the futuristic feature film script City of Night. The story revolves around the survivors of a worldwide plague, who gather together in the Bowery of New York City, forming a new minority in America at the bottom of society, with their own mysterious night culture, the gangsters who rule it, and the cops who try to take it back.

Leekley is also the best-selling author of fiction and non-fiction books.  He is an historical author, having co-written Moments: The Pulitzer Prize Photographs and edited Reflections on the Civil War, the last book by historian Bruce Catton. He completed the manuscript for a novel, Jazzmen, an epic story about the jazz era from 1900 to the 1920s, set in New Orleans, the river boats, and amidst the mobsters of Chicago.  Recently, he wrote the screenplay The White Rose, a true story of medical students in Nazi Germany who formed the only national resistance movement against Hitler and the Gestapo.

He is represented by the Kaplan Stahler Agency.

Filmography

As director
Prince of Central Park (2000)

As producer
The Blue and the Gray (1982), associate producer
Private Eye (1987), co-producer
Nightmare Cafe (1992), supervising producer
In the Company of Darkness (1993), supervising producer
Knight Rider 2010 (1994), executive producer
She Fought Alone (1995), producer
The Omen, 1995, executive producer
Kindred: The Embraced (1996), executive producer
Buried Secrets (1996), executive producer
Buried Secrets (1996), executive producer
Night Sins (1997), co-executive producer
Spawn (1999), co-executive producer
Wolf Lake (2001), executive producer
Mafia Doctor (2003)

As writer
The Blue and the Gray (1982)
In the Company of Darkness (1993)
Knight Rider 2010 (1994)
She Fought Alone (1995)
The Omen (1995)
Buried Secrets (1996)
Kindred: The Embraced (1996)
Night Sins (1997)
Prince of Central Park (2000)
Wolf Lake (2001)
Spawn (1999)
Mafia Doctor (2003)
Leekley has also written episodes of Miami Vice, Nightmare Cafe, and Private Eye.

In the 1990s he wrote a bible for a proposed Doctor Who TV series but was ultimately unused.

Published works
Moments: the Pulitzer Prize photographs (coauthored with Sheryle Leekley, 1978)
Reflections on the Civil War (edited for Bruce Catton, 1981)
The Blue and the Gray : a novel (with Bruce Catton and Ian McLellan Hunter, 1982)

References

External links

http://www.johnleekley.com/

American male screenwriters
American television producers
Living people
Year of birth missing (living people)